WTQT-LP (106.1 FM) is a low-power FM (LPFM) radio station offering gospel music. The station began on May 8, 2003, and is licensed to Baton Rouge, Louisiana.  It broadcasts with an ERP of 71 watts and is available on the Internet.

External links
 

Radio stations in Louisiana
Low-power FM radio stations in Louisiana
Gospel radio stations in the United States
Radio stations established in 2003